Abraham Isaac Polack was a Dutch Jewish engraver who worked in Amsterdam in the 18th century.

References

Engravers from Amsterdam
Dutch Jews